Somajiguda is a Commercial Centre of Hyderabad located on either sides of Raj Bhavan Road. It started as a peaceful residential locality but slowly has transformed into a modern business centre in Hyderabad, Telangana, India. It is a hub of commercial activity with many jewellery, automobile and banking establishments running their businesses from here. Popular landmarks are Raj Bhavan, The Park and Yashoda hospital. Somajiguda has also gained importance because of its proximity to city centres such as Begumpet, Punjagutta and Khairtabad. The official residence of Governor of State of Telangana - the Raj Bhavan is in Somajiguda.

Etymology 
Somajiguda is named after Sonaji Pandit, a Daftardar (revenue officer) in the estate of Raja Rai Rayan, a nobleman of Hyderabad in 1853. A mansion was built by the then Raja of the Rai Rayan estate during the rule of Nasir-ud-Daulah for Sonaji Pandit as a respect towards his service and popularity. Sonaji Pandit resided in this mansion in his entire life. Over time Sonaji-Guda (Guda meaning place in the local dialect of Telugu) became Somajiguda.

Economy

Automobile 
Somajiguda is a hub for automobile sales with showrooms of Honda, Skoda, Volkswagen, Maruti Suzuki, Nexa, Hero, Yamaha, Bajaj and TVS. This led to many car interior refurbishing shops setting up their business there, some tying up with international brands like 3M.

Health & Fitness 
Somajiguda has the largest number of Health and Fitness products stores in the city. You can get all types of fitness and gym equipment in the area with multiple stores selling them.

Banking 
Somajiguda is home to international banking institutions such as the Standard Chartered, Bank of Mauritius, HDFC, HSBC, and Bank of Kuwait. Many Indian banks like State Bank of India, IndusInd, Canara Bank, Karnataka Bank, Kotak Mahindra, South Indian Bank, and Yes Bank have their regional offices or branches there.

Commercial and IT 
Well known companies such as ADP, Cavium, Vijai Electrical, Creamline Dairy Products Ltd., Pitti Laminations Ltd., Sri Chakra Cements, Geo infospace Pvt LTD, Ramky Industries, BlueDart, Reliance Jio and many others operate their businesses in Somajiguda. Babukhan Millennium Centre and Fortune Towers are two prominent commercial office space providers.

Hospitals, medicine and emergency
 Yashoda Hospitals
 Deccan Hospital
 Matrika Hospital
 Maxivision Eye Hospital
 Vijaya Diagnostics
 Zoi Hospital

Hotels and hospitality 
Seven to three-star hotels such as The Park, Katriya hotel & towers, IK London and others are located in Somajiguda. Real estate is on the rise with newer structures coming up in this area. Apart from hotels, there are many service apartments for people looking to stay for long duration at affordable costs.

Shopping and entertainment 
Somajiguda is also a well known shopping centre with big brands lined up at Somajiguda circle.

Somajiguda has over 30 jewellery showrooms packed within a stretch of half a kilometre. It is a centre of jewellery shopping as gifting of gold to the bride by her parents obligatory in Hindu weddings.

Food 
KFC, Pizza Hut, and Sanjos Donuts are located right next to the Necklace Road MMTS station.

Amrutha Mall hosts Minerva Coffee Shop and Deccan Multi cuisine restaurant, which are excellent food joints and popular too.

Irani restaurant Red Rose Hotel is near-by and easily accessible. Tung kein is a brilliant chinese restaurant, ideal for takeaways. The Palate, Annapurna tiffins, Bandhan sweets and chaat are great places to eat.

Music 
The BOSE music store in the city is located there.

Pubs and restaurants 
Headquarters is a popular rest-o-bar on Raj Bhavan Road. Aish, Aqua and Carbon are popular watering-hole(s) and restaurant(s) in The Park.

Education 
 Nasr School Pre Primary 
 Roots International School of Business Management (www.roots.ac.in)
 Vila Marie - college for women offering courses from intermediate through degree and master's programmes.
 Blueberry Kids
 Mt Helicon Public School
 Sri Sri Ravishankar Vidya Mandir
 Zikra High School
 Hamstech Institute of Fashion and Interior Design
 ROOTS college of hotel management and culinary arts (www.rhmca.ac.in )
 ROOTS junior college (www. rjc.ac.in)
Digiquest Institute of Creative Arts & Design Offers Creative Engineering Multimedia bachelor's degree Programmes in Game Development & Computer Science, VR/AR, Game Art & Design, Animation & Visual Effects, Photography, Rajbhavan Road, Somajiguda.

Government 
Many government buildings are located in Somajiguda. These include
 Administrative Staff College of India
 Lake View Guest House
 Raj Bhavan
 Government Nursing School
 Dilkusha Guest House
 Andhra Pradesh Dairy Development Corporation Ltd.
 National Institute of Amateur Radio (HAM)

Localities 
 Raj Bhavan Road
 Jaffar Ali Bagh
 Durga Nagar Colony
 Asif Avenue
 Kapadia Lane
 Gulmohar Avenue
 Matha Nagar Colony
 BS Makhta
 MS Maktha

Public transport and connectivity
Somajiguda is well connected by TSRTC buses. The closest MMTS stations are Necklace Road, Khairtabad and 2 kilometers away Begumpet. The closest Metro stations are Panjagutta and Khairtabad.

References

External links 
 

  

Neighbourhoods in Hyderabad, India